Paul Speiser (16 October 1846, in Basel – 9 October 1935) was a Swiss politician and President of the Swiss National Council (1907/1908).

Works

Further reading

External links 

 
 

1846 births
1935 deaths
Politicians from Basel-Stadt
Swiss Calvinist and Reformed Christians
Liberal Party of Switzerland politicians
Members of the National Council (Switzerland)
Presidents of the National Council (Switzerland)